Allen Taylor is an American scientist and Professor of Nutrition, Development, Molecular and Chemical Biology, and Ophthalmology. He is the Senior Scientist and Director of the Laboratory for Nutrition & Vision Research (LNVR) at the Human Nutrition Research Center on Aging. Dr. Taylor also founded and directs the Science Training Encouraging Peace Graduate Training Program (STEP-GTP), which pairs Israeli and Palestinian advanced level health science students in the same graduate training program in an effort to foster sustainable, cooperative relationships that advance the careers of the STEP Fellows and provide improved health care in the communities they serve. Thus, STEP endeavors to  build bridges for productive and cooperative living between the STEP Fellows and the communities.

Education 
Taylor earned his B.S. in Chemistry from City College of New York, Ph.D. in Organic Chemistry from Rutgers University, and completed his postdoctoral work at the University of California, Berkeley.

Research
Dr. Taylor directs, coordinates and designs (with LNVR staff) epidemiological, clinical, and laboratory research in the LNVR and its collaborating institutions. This includes human and animal studies that seek to discover behaviors, environmental influences, methods and molecules that diminish the risk for cataract and AMD (age-related macular degeneration). He designs laboratory studies which are defining relations between sugars and other carbohydrates, vitamins and antioxidants, oxidative stress, protein damage, aberrations in protein turnover, protein quality control, and the cytotoxic accumulation of damaged proteins upon aging in the eye. This work includes studies regarding the roles of the ubiquitin proteolytic pathway in cell proliferation, differentiation and organogenesis." Specific research emphasis areas are elucidating why consuming higher glycemia diets (glycemis index or glycemis load) is associated with enhanced risk for AMD, cataract, diabetes, and cardiovascular disease, and how minor dietary behavior changes can diminish risk for these diseases.

Positions and awards
In addition to his work at the Human Nutrition Research Center on Aging and with STEP-GTP, Dr. Taylor has been Senior Fellow in the Fulbright Program and has been awarded the Osborne and Mendel Award for Excellence in Nutrition Research, the Denham Harman Award for Excellence in Aging Research, and the Pfizer Consumer Healthcare Nutritional Sciences Award.

In 2013 Taylor was honored as a fellow in the American Society for Nutrition.

Publications
Taylor is the author or co-author of more than 190 peer-reviewed articles, 40 chapters and reviews, and 2 books.

References

Year of birth missing (living people)
Living people
American nutritionists
City College of New York alumni
Rutgers University alumni
Tufts University faculty
Vision scientists